The 1997 Afro-Asian Cup of Nations was the seventh edition of the Afro-Asian Cup of Nations, it was contested between Saudi Arabia, winners of the 1996 Asian Cup, and South Africa, winners of the 1996 African Cup of Nations. The matches were originally planned to be played in 1997, but both teams couldn't be bothered to find time on the calendar. After being delayed for two years, the matches were finally played in 1999. South Africa won the title on aggregate score 1–0.

Qualified teams

Match details

First leg

Second leg

Winners
South Africa won 1–0 on aggregates.

References

External links
1997 Afro-Asian Cup of Nations - rsssf.com

Afro-Asian Cup of Nations
Afro-Asian Cup of Nations
Mer
Mer
1999–2000 in South African soccer
1999–2000 in Saudi Arabian football
South Africa national soccer team matches
Saudi Arabia national football team matches
September 1999 sports events in Africa
September 1999 sports events in Asia